Flabellobasis montana is a species of snout moth. It was described by Boris Balinsky in 1991 and is known from South Africa.

References

Endemic moths of South Africa
Moths described in 1991
Phycitinae